Hyperborea is the nineteenth major release and thirteenth studio album by Tangerine Dream. It spent two weeks on the UK album chart peaking at No.45.

The album title refers to Hyperborea, a mythical, idyllic land in the Ancient Greek tradition, supposedly located far to the north of Thrace and where it was claimed the sun shone twenty-four hours a day.

Track listing

Personnel
 Edgar Froese
 Christopher Franke
 Johannes Schmoelling

References

1983 albums
Tangerine Dream albums
Virgin Records albums